Asim Bala is an Indian politician. He was elected to the Lok Sabha, the lower house of the Parliament of India from the Nabadwip in West Bengal as a member of the Communist Party of India (Marxist).

References

Communist Party of India (Marxist) politicians from West Bengal
Lok Sabha members from West Bengal
India MPs 1989–1991
India MPs 1996–1997
India MPs 1991–1996
India MPs 1998–1999
1941 births
Living people
People from Nadia district